Atskuri is a Georgian feudal fortress on the right bank of the Mtkvari (Kura) River, approximately 30 kilometres from Borjomi, in the Samtskhe-Javakheti region.

Built in the 9th century, Atskuri Fortress was an important stronghold for the defense of Georgia during the Middle ages.

History
The fortress was probably situated near the town of Atskuri, of which no traces have been found. First mentioned in the 9th century, the fortress was significantly damaged in the 16th century when it was occupied by the Turks. It was rebuilt in the 17-18th centuries. In the 1820s the fortress was released.

Architecture
Set on the top of high cliff, the fortress occupies a vast area, and is made of several parts, with the citadel at its highest point. The fortress territory includes also ruins of a church with remnants of frescos. The water-supply tunnel connects the fortress with the river.

See also 
 Atsquri church

References

External links 

 Atskuri, historical monuments of Georgia. 
 Atskuri Fortress, photo gallery.
 Information about Atskuri Temple.

Castles and forts in Georgia (country)
Buildings and structures in Samtskhe–Javakheti
Immovable Cultural Monuments of National Significance of Georgia